Abby Sen is a 2015 Bengali science fiction comedy film directed by Atanu Ghosh and produced by Firdausul Hassan and Probal Halder. It features Abir Chatterjee, Raima Sen, Chiranjeet Chakraborty, Bratya Basu, and Priyanka Sarkar in lead roles, with Neel Mukherjee, Biswanath Basu, and Bhaswar Chatterjee in supporting roles. The music is composed by Joy Sarkar. It is Atanu Ghosh's fifth feature film after Angshumaner Chhobi, Takhan Teish, Rupkatha Noy, Ek Phaali Rodh and was released 30 October 2015.

Plot 
Kolkata 2013. Abby Sen is a 30-year-old television producer. He is academically brilliant and has a strong background in science, and watching science fiction films is his greatest passion. But his programmes on television are never popular and fail to make a mark on the TRP ratings. And that is perhaps the only reason why Abby has lost no less than seven jobs. Every time he is fired, his wife Somy gets hysterical and throws down everything that she could lay her hands on. So Abby has not disclosed his last dismissal to her.

By sheer coincidence, Abby meets a self-styled scientist who claims to have discovered a time-travel capsule. The scientist volunteers to take Abby back in time to when getting a job was not that difficult. But he has certain conditions, which Abby must fulfill. Finding all options bleak, Abby decides to agree to his conditions and travel 33 years back in time, that is, to 1980.

Thereafter, a series of unforeseen incidents and intricacies of relationships make Abby's life in 1980 as eventful as ever. But flung between the two worlds of 1980 and 2013 both in his personal and professional life, Abby represents the predicament of a man struggling to survive in this competitive world.

Science
The film subtly touches on the theory of chronology protection conjecture. Despite Abby Sen's effort, the past chronology remains unchanged. The director did not venture into the nitty gritty of time travel theory. He rather nicely explained the intricacies, a human relationship can face in case of such event!

Cast
Abir Chatterjee as Abby Sen
Raima Sen as Parama
Chiranjeet Chakraborty as Scientist
Arunima Ghosh as Somy
Bratya Basu as Director, Grand Channel 
Priyanka Sarkar as Srirupa 
Kanchan Mullick as Bila
Neel Mukherjee as Bimbo
Biswanath Basu as Jatin
Bhaswar Chatterjee as Samik
Paran Bandopadhyay as Dhiraj
Kharaj Mukherjee as Hiran

Soundtrack

The music and background score for the film is composed by Joy Sarkar.

References 

Bengali-language Indian films
2010s Bengali-language films
Films directed by Atanu Ghosh
Indian science fiction comedy films